Adel Wgdan Mahmood Al Chadli (born 13 April 2000) is a Yemeni footballer who plays for Ittihad Kalba as a winger.

Career statistics

Club

Notes

References

2000 births
Living people
Yemeni footballers
Yemeni expatriate footballers
Association football wingers
UAE Pro League players
Al Ahli Club (Dubai) players
Shabab Al-Ahli Club players
Al-Ittihad Kalba SC players
Expatriate footballers in the United Arab Emirates
Expatriate footballers in Switzerland
Yemeni expatriate sportspeople in the United Arab Emirates
Yemeni expatriate sportspeople in Switzerland